Kosrap Township is a historic township of Akto County in Xinjiang Uygur Autonomous Region, China. It ceased to exist as a township and its territory was amalgamated to Qarlung Township on August 27, 2018. All the residents of the former Kosrap Township migrated to Dayasdun in Zepu County. Meanwhile, the Tong'an Township was established in Dayasdun of Zepu County on August 27, 2018, its seat ia at Yengavati Village.

History

Since 1912, Kosrap had been the township of Puli County (present Taxkorgan). In 1950, Taxkorgan Tajik Autonomous County was established, and Kosrap was a township in the 2nd district of Taxkorgan. In September 1954, the Kizilsu Kyrgyz Autonomous Prefecture was established and Kosrap was transferred to Qarlung Township of Akto County from Taxkorgan. In 1961, the commune of Kosrap was re-established from Qarlung, and in 1965 it was merged into Qarlung. In 1981, Kosrap Commune was re-established. In October 1984, it was reorganized into a township. Because the residential area of the township is located in the Altash Water Conservancy Project reservoir area, its residents needed to be moved to the adjacent Dayasdun in Zepu County. On August 27, 2018, Kosrap was merged into Qarlung, while Tong'an Township was formed in Dayasdun.

Administrative divisions
Before its ceasing to exist as a separate division of township in 2018, Kosirap had 4 villages (as of 2017) with 19 unincorporated villages under its jurisdiction.

4 administration villages
 Akqig Village
 Kekluk Village
 Yengiawat Village
 Zongtax Village

 Unincorporated villages  
 Kizilegil

Resettlement
The township of Kosrap is located in the Altash Reservoir area. As one of the  construction projects, its resettlement was started in 2017 and completed in 2018. The small town relocation and  resettlement area of Kosrap Township for Altash Water Conservancy Project is located in Dayasdun of Zepu County, 32 kilometers away from the county seat of Zepu County, and 8 kilometers away from Jinhuyang National Forest Park at 5A level. It was planned to use 200 hectares of land for residential areas, 1,200 hectares of forage land, 1,067 hectares of reserved land, and 300 hectares of food grain land. 1,276 households with 4,543 people need to be resettled.

References 

Township-level divisions of Akto County